Louis-Jean-Baptiste-Étienne Vigée (2 December 1758 – 8 August 1820) was a French playwright and man of letters.

Early life
Born into an artistic family, he was the son of the pastellist Louis Vigée and the brother of the celebrated painter Élisabeth Vigée.

Biography
Vigée was popular in the salons for his pleasant personality and quick wit. He was employed as a secretary to Marie Joséphine of Savoy, the Countess of Provence, wife of future king Louis XVIII, and sister in law of King Louis XVI and Marie Antoinette.

He wrote poetry in praise of the French Revolution, although his enthusiasm quickly faded and he was at one point arrested as a Girondist. He lived long enough to write poetry both in praise of Napoleon and Louis XVIII.

He succeeded Sautreau de Marsy as editor of the poetry magazine Almanach des Muses from 1794 until 1820, and replaced La Harpe at the Lycée, but had nowhere near the same success as a teacher. 

As a playwright he was a skilled imitator of Dorat and Gresset, he put together several clever plays with many points of interest both in style and plotting.

Honours
He was appointed a Knight of the Legion of Honour (Chevalier de la Légion d'honneur).

Works

Plays
 Les Aveux difficiles (1783), one act in verse
 La Fausse coquette (1784), three acts in verse
 Les Amants timides (1785)
 La Belle-Mère, ou les Dangers d’un second mariage (1788), five acts in verse
 L’Entrevue (1788), one act in verse
 Le Projet extravagant (1792)
 La Matinée d’une jolie femme (1792)
 La Vivacité à l’épreuve (1793)
 Ninon de Lenclos (1797)
 La Princesse de Babylone (1815)
A sample can be found in Bibliothèque dramatique (1824).

Other
 Manuel de littérature (Paris, 1809, duodecimo)
 La Tendresse filiale, poem (Paris, 1812, sextodecimo)
 Poésies, first published with Poèmes by Legouvé (1799, octavo), then alone (5th ed. Paris, 1813, octodecimo)
 Procès et mort de Louis XVI, fragments d’un poème (Paris, 1814, octavo)
 Le Pour et le Contre, dialogue en vers (Paris, 1818, octavo)

Bibliography
 Élisabeth Vigée, Souvenirs, Paris, H. Fournier, 1835, 3 vol. octavo
 Gustave Vapereau, Dictionnaire universel des littératures, Paris, Hachette, 1876, p. 2032

External links
 La Matinée d’une jolie femme, one-act comedy in prose, Paris, Girod et Tessier, 1793
 Poésies, Paris, Delaunay, 1813
 His plays and their performances on the site CÉSAR

1758 births
1820 deaths
18th-century French dramatists and playwrights
18th-century French writers
18th-century French male writers
19th-century French dramatists and playwrights
Writers from Paris
Etienne